The Bongo languages, or Bongo–Baka, comprise six languages spoken in South Sudan. They are members of the Central Sudanic language family.

The most populous Bongo language is Jur Modo, spoken by a hundred thousand people. The languages are:
 Bongo
 Baka
 Morokodo–Beli
 Jur Modo
 Morokodo (Nyamusa-Molo, Mo’da)
 Jur Beli (Beli)
 Mittu (extinct)

In various classifications, Bongo is sometimes split off from the rest of the family, so the phrase Bongo–Baka may be less ambiguous than simply Bongo.

However, Boyeldieu (2006) does not consider Bongo–Baka to be a valid grouping, and considers Bongo and Baka to each be primary splits from Proto-Sara-Bongo-Bagirmi.

References

Roger Blench (n.d.) Nilo-Saharan language listing

Bongo–Bagirmi languages
Languages of South Sudan